Glyphostoma myrae is a species of sea snail, a marine gastropod mollusk in the family Clathurellidae,.

Description

Distribution
This species occurs in the Pacific Ocean along Panama.

References

External links
 

myrae
Gastropods described in 1971